is a mountain located in Niigata Prefecture, Japan. 

Yahikoyama Ropeway runs between the peak and the foot.

Gallery

See also 

 Yahiko Shrine
 Yahiko, Niigata

Yahiko
Yahiko, Niigata